The Confederation of African Football (CAF) section of the 1990 FIFA World Cup qualification saw teams competing for two berths in the final tournament in Italy.

26 nations in total entered the qualifying stage. FIFA rejected the entries of Mauritius and Mozambique due to their outstanding debts, leaving 24 nations to contest the qualifying spots. Lesotho, Rwanda and Togo withdrew after the draw for the first round, which took place on 12 December 1987, but before playing a match. Libya won their first round tie and advanced to the second round, but withdrew halfway through that stage, meaning all their results in the group were annulled.

Format
First Round: Algeria, Cameroon, Ivory Coast, Egypt, Kenya, Morocco,  Nigeria and Zaire, the eight best ranked teams according to FIFA, received byes and advanced to the Second Round directly. The remaining sixteen teams were paired up to play knockout matches on a home-and-away basis. The winners would advance to the Second Round.
Second Round: The eight winners from the first round were joined by the eight seeded teams and divided into four groups of four teams each. The teams would play against each other on a home-and-away basis. The group winners would advance to the Final Round.
Final Round: The four remaining teams were paired up to play knockout matches on a home-and-away basis. The winners would qualify.

First round

Eight knockout (two-legged) ties were originally required, involving the sixteen lowest ranked African countries. The withdrawals of three teams meant only five ties were actually contested. The eight successful teams advanced to the group format of the second round.

|}

Second round

The eight qualifiers from the first round were joined by the eight highest-ranked CAF teams. The teams were split into four groups of four which played a home-and-away round-robin, with the four group winners advancing to the final round.

Group A

Libya played one match in this group before withdrawing from the competition, annulling their results.

Group B

Group C

Group D

Final round

|}

The four group winners from the second round were drawn into two ties. The winner of each two-legged tie qualified for the 1990 FIFA World Cup.

Egypt won 1–0 on aggregate and qualified for the 1990 World Cup.
 

Cameroon won 3–0 on aggregate and qualified for the 1990 World Cup.

Qualified teams

1 Bold indicates champions for that year. Italic indicates hosts for that year.

Goalscorers

4 goals

 François Omam-Biyik

3 goals

 Rabah Madjer
 Djamel Menad
 André Kana-Biyik
 Abdel Rasoul Hesham
 Peterkins Kayira
 Stephen Keshi
 Jameleddine Limam
 Eugène Kabongo

2 goals

 José Vieira Dias
 Joseph Maluka
 Émile Mbouh
 Abdoulaye Emmerson
 Oumar Ben Salah
 James Debbah
 George Weah
 Samson Siasia
 Nabil Maâloul
 Sundayin Moriri
 N'Kiambi Mapuata
 Kalusha Bwalya
 Derby Makinka

1 goal

 Mavango Kiala
 Osvaldo de Oliveira
 Paulão
 Manuel Saavedra
 Gabriel Gnimassou
 Jules Kadeba
 Bonaventure Djonkep
 Emmanuel Kundé
 Louis-Paul Mfédé
 Mohamed Ala'a
 Mohamed El-Akad
 Hossam Hassan
 Ibrahim Hassan
 Régis Manon
 Michel Minico
 Joel Minko
 Guy-Roger Nzamba
 Nicaise Ondeno
 Camara Toure
 Peter Dawo
 George Onyango
 Jean-Pierre Guede Akenon
 Yao Lambert Amani
 Sékou Bamba
 Ezzewdin Bezan
 Fawzi El-Aisawi
 Ayad El-Ghadi
 Gilbert Chirwa
 Singo McDonald
 Lawrence Waya
 Aziz Bouderbala
 Mohamed Madih
 Abdelfettah Rhiati
 Mohammed Timoumi
 Michael Obiku
 Wole Odegbami
 Osama Idriss 
 Lasaad Abdelli
 Tarak Dhiab
 Bassam Jeridi
 Mohamed Ali Mahjoubi
 Kais Yâakoubi
 Kuyangana Makukula
 Nkiere Wawa
 Lucky Msiska
 Charly Musonda
 Witson Nyirenda
 Stanley Ndunduma

External links
 Africa Zone at FIFA.com
 World Cup 1990 qualifications - Africa at RSSSF.com

 
CAF
FIFA World Cup qualification (CAF)
Qual